The 8th Houston Film Critics Society Awards nominations were announced on the December 16, 2014. The 2014 awards were given out at a ceremony held at the Sundance Cinemas Houston on January 10, 2015. The awards are presented annually by the Houston Film Critics Society based in Houston, Texas.

Winners and nominees 
Winners are listed first and highlighted with boldface.

Movies with multiple nominations and awards

The following 16 films received multiple nominations:

The following 3 films received multiple awards:

References

External links 
 Houston Film Critics Society: Awards

2014
2014 film awards
2014 in Texas
Houston